The Rhenus Group is a German logistics company with operations in Europe, Asia and North and South America. It is a subsidiary of the Rethmann Group.

History

On 13 November 1912 Badische Actiengesellschaft für Rheinschiffahrt und Seetransport and Rheinschiffahrts Actiengesellschaft established a joint company with headquarters in Frankfurt. It was named Rhenus adopting the Latin word for the Rhine. Branch offices were established in Antwerp, Mainz, Mannheim and Rotterdam. In 1929 Rhenus merged with Badische Actiengesellschaft, Rheinschiffahrts Actiengesellschaft and other shipping companies. In 1934 Hibernia Bergwerksgesellschaft, a subsidiary of VEBA, acquired a majority shareholding in the company.

In 1969 VEBA restructured. Hugo Stinnes AG taking over the transport activities of VEBA. In 1971 Hugo Stinnes AG restructured its inland waterway shipping activities. The Fendel-Stinnes-Schiffahrt company was set up near Duisburg.

In 1976 Rhenus merged with Fendel-Stinnes-Schiffahrt and WTAG to form Rhenus-WTAG with company headquarters moving to Dortmund. At this stage, Rhenus-WTAG had 40 branch offices throughout Germany. The CCS Combined Container Service was founded at the same time.

In 1984 Rhenus-WTAG merged with Westfaelische Transport-AG and resumed under the name Rhenus. In 1988 Rhenus was restructured into three companies: Rhenus Weichelt handled road freight transport, Rhenus Lager und Umschlag took on warehousing, transhipment and inland waterway shipping and Rhenus Transport International was responsible for international freight forwarding and air freight.

In 1990 Stinnes AG (1979 change of name from Hugo Stinnes AG) entered into a strategic alliance with Schenker AG, acquiring a 25% stake in this subsidiary of Deutsche Bahn. In 1991 Stinnes purchased Schenker AG outright and the three Rhenus divisions were restructured again. Rhenus Transport International became part of the newly formed Schenker International; Rhenus Lager und Umschlag then operated under the former name of Rhenus, and Rhenus-Weichelt was merged with Schenker Eurocargo. In 1996 the three divisions were merged under the umbrella of Schenker-Rhenus AG company.

In 1993, a 60,000 m² logistics centre opened in Berlin. Other logistics centres were opened in the following years in Langgöns, Giessen, Mannheim, Stuttgart, Hanover and Prague. In 1998 Rethmann & Co took over Rhenus.

In 2000 Rhenus acquired Schweizerische Reederei und Neptun and rebranded it Rhenus Alpina. In the same year, Rhenus started operating the Ikea central warehouse in Salzgitter and launched the International Consolidation Centre in Giessen. In 2002, Rhenus Alpina took over Cargologic and began handling air freight at Bern, Geneva and Zurich Airports. A new logistics centre was built near Paris and an external supplier warehouse for Daimler-Benz opened in Stuttgart. In 2003, Rhenus set up a joint venture with Kerry Logistics in Asia. In 2004 Polish logistics provider Polta was purchased.

In 2012 Rhenus founded Contargo for inland container logistics.

In December 2014 Rhenus purchased a 50.1% shareholding in Swiss rail freight operator Crossrail AG. In June 2015 it acquired a 50% shareholding in Austrian rail freight operator LTE Logistik. In January 2019, Rhenus' parent company Rethmann Group acquired Veolia's remaining 30% shareholding of Transdev, and increased its shareholding to 34% by contributing Rhenus Veniro operations to the Transdev portfolio.

Rhenus Veniro

Rhenus Veniro operates public transport companies in Germany. It was formed in December 2007 when the Eurobahn joint venture between Keolis (60%) and Rhenus (40%) was dissolved, with Rhenus Veniro taking nine bus companies, two railway contracts and a tram contract, while Keolis continued to operate Eurobahn rail services. It currently operates two railway contracts in Rhineland-Palatinate. 

In January 2019, Rethmann Group, the parent company of Rhenus, contributed the Rhenus Veniro operations to the Transdev portfolio as part of its acquisition of Transdev shareholding.

References

External links

Rhenus Veniro website (subsidiary)
Rethmann Group website (parent)

Companies based in North Rhine-Westphalia
Logistics companies of Germany
German companies established in 1912